Ceuta was a  cargo ship which was built in 1929 for the Oldenburg-Portugiesische Dampfschiffs-Reederei. She was sunk during an air raid in 1943, but later raised, repaired and returned to service. She was seized as a war prize in 1945, passed to the British Ministry of War Transport (MoWT) and renamed Empire Camel.

In 1946 she was passed to the Danish Government and renamed Rinkenæs. In 1947 she was sold to the Faroe Islands and renamed Oyrnafjall. In 1956 she was sold back to the Oldenburg-Portugiesische Dampfschiffs-Reederei and renamed Safi, serving until scrapped in January 1960.

Description
The ship was built by Deutsche Werft, Hamburg. She was launched in 1929.

Her GRT was 2,716 and she had a NRT of 1,603. The engine developed .

History
Ceuta was built for the Oldenburg-Portugiesische Dampfschiffs-Reederei, the company's third ship to carry that name. Her port of registry was Oldenburg and in 1930 her Code Letters were NHDL. In 1934, her Code Letters were changed to DNAH, these were changed to DNAX in 1937. On 28 March 1943, Ceuta was sunk in an air raid at Rotterdam. She was later raised, repaired and returned to service. In May 1945, she was seized as a war prize at Kiel.

Ceuta was passed to the MoWT and renamed Empire Camel. She was placed under the management of John Bruce & Co Ltd. Her port of registry was changed to London and the Code Letters GQXT were allocated. She was passed to the Danish Government in 1946 and renamed Rinkenæs. She was operated under the management of T. C. Christensen, Copenhagen. In 1947, she was sold to Færøernes Lagting, Faroe Islands and renamed Oyrnafjall. Her port of registry was Tórshavn and her Code Letters were OXEF. serving with them until 1956, when she was sold to Oldenburg-Portugiesische Dampfschiffs-Reederei and renamed Safi. She was scrapped in Hamburg in January 1960.

References

1929 ships
Ships built in Hamburg
Merchant ships of Germany
Steamships of Germany
World War II merchant ships of Germany
Merchant ships sunk by aircraft
Maritime incidents in March 1943
Ministry of War Transport ships
Empire ships
Merchant ships of the United Kingdom
Steamships of the United Kingdom
Merchant ships of Denmark
Steamships of Denmark
Merchant ships of the Faroe Islands
Steamships of the Faroe Islands
Merchant ships of West Germany
Steamships of West Germany